Michael Christopher "Mike" Fuentes (born December 14, 1984) is a former American musician. He is best known as the former drummer for the post-hardcore band Pierce the Veil alongside his older brother Vic Fuentes. Fuentes was the percussionist for the supergroup Isles & Glaciers. He had more recently began a hip hop solo project under the stage name MikeyWhiskeyHands in which he raps on instrumentals produced by Pierce the Veil's bassist Jaime Preciado. Fuentes signed to Velocity Records in March 2012. Both brothers attended Mission Bay Senior High School. Mike graduated with the Class of 2003, where he was also voted "Most Likely To Be Famous" in the yearbook that year.

Discography

Before Today
A Celebration of an Ending (2004)

Pierce the Veil

A Flair for the Dramatic (2007)
Selfish Machines (2010)
Collide with the Sky (2012)
Misadventures (2016)

Isles and Glaciers
The Hearts of Lonely People EP – (2010)

MikeyWhiskeyHands!
Singles
 "Money Matrz, Bitches Don't"
 "Straight Golden" with "The Saintz"
 "Tonight (Living the Life)"
 "Party with the Band"
 "This Ain't a Game" (featuring Jonny Craig (credited as Dr. Craig))
 "$ex, Drugz and WhiskeyHands" (featuring Jonny Craig (credited as Dr. Craig) & Jaime Preciado (credited as The Architechhh))
Get Your Mind Right (2012), Velocity Records

Tours
The World Tour (Leg One): Featuring Sleeping With Sirens, Beartooth, This Wild Life.
The World Tour (Leg Two): Featuring Sleeping With Sirens, Issues

Allegations of misconduct 
In mid-November 2017 Fuentes was accused of statutory rape and soliciting nude photos via AOL Instant Messenger by a child. The incidents have alleged to occur over several years roughly a decade prior; the pair initiated contact on MySpace before meeting for the first time at a Pierce the Veil Concert at Chain Reaction club in Anaheim, California, when Fuentes was 24 and the child was a minor of 16. The child stated they had sex after meeting again at the Pomona concert stop during Warped Tour, however she admitted to hiding her real age from him in her allegations. The relationship was said to have lasted until she became an adult, turning 18.

Meanwhile a second woman accused him of sexual misconduct, specifically for requesting nude pictures from her when she was a minor. The 23-year-old opened up, first meeting Fuentes at Warped Tour 2008. Both exchanged mobile phone numbers and stayed in contact afterwards. When she turned 15, Fuentes requested nude photos from her. 

The band replied to these accusations in mid December. On December 16, 2017, Fuentes responded to the allegations and stated that he is taking a break from Pierce the Veil. Vocalist and guitarist Vic Fuentes later clarified that Mike Fuentes had not been part of the band since 2017, and that he would not be featured on their next album.

References

External links
Official website / blog
Twitter
Pierce the Veil at Myspace

1984 births
Living people
Musicians from San Diego
American people of Mexican descent
American drummers
Pierce the Veil members
21st-century American drummers
Hispanic and Latino American musicians
Underminded members
Isles & Glaciers members